The Melkonian Educational Institute (MEI) was an Armenian boarding school of high academic standard located in Nicosia, Cyprus.

Established in 1926 by the Melkonian brothers, it was the only remaining boarding school servicing students of the Armenian Diaspora from nearly 40 countries.

Melkonian's current status is uncertain.

Formerly financed by the Armenian General Benevolent Union, a decision to cut off funding in 2005 caused controversy among the Armenian community and especially among former pupils.

History

Early history 
The Melkonian Institution was created as an orphanage in the aftermath of the [[Armenian genocide]Word Gemocide was defined in 1944] of 1915–1923. Zaven Patriarch of Constantinople was the first director of this institution, who in April 1926 undertook the heavy task of traveling and collecting over 300 orphans, boys and girls, amongst thousands of children left destitute on the plains of  Eastern Anatolia and in the neighboring countries as a result of the Armenian Genocide.

The Melkonian Institution as a safe haven is therefore regarded as being closely connected with the dark pages of the early 20th century Armenian History. The hundreds and thousands of orphans that were provided with shelter, sustenance and schooling by dint of the enormous gift bequeathed by  Garabed & Krikor Melkonian benefactor brothers, confirm this.
On Friday, February 15, 1924 the foundational stone was laid and the construction of Melkonian Establishments began in Nicosia.
Melkonian School opened its gates two years later in 1926.

The Melkonian Brothers 
Krikor Melkonian and Garabed Melkonian are widely regarded as the greatest benefactors of the Armenian nation.  They were prominent tobacco traders from Egypt.  In the aftermath of the Armenian Genocide they decided to establish this school in Cyprus.  To that end, they liquidated all their assets and established the Melkonian Fund and entrusted the management (and not the ownership) of the Melkonian School to the AGBU.

Both brothers are buried at the School grounds, at the open space between the two main buildings. A beautifully designed marble monument with intricate engravings and the bronze busts of the Melkonian Brothers prominently stand as a gesture of eternal gratitude to their memory.  For thousands of Melkonian graduates and friends this is a sacred place.

The Forest of Remembrance 

Along the Lemesou Avenue, occupying the foreground of the Melkonian campus, there is a grove of cypress trees, hundreds and thousands of them.
This grove is a significant landmark and has a historic and sentimental value to the Armenian Nation. Nowhere else in the world, not even in Armenia, the Armenian Genocide  is memorialised in this manner.
Cyprus government has officially listed this forest.

Recent history 

In the summer of 1974 as a result of Turkish invasion of Cyprus numerous bombs were dropped on Melkonian grounds and buildings causing damage.

In 1986 a quarter of the Melkonian Estate was sold off at, what many regard as a ridiculously low prices (the legality of this act is also questioned).  The aim was to reinvest the money in a new Boarding House, a closed sports complex and a commercial centre. All these projects went ahead.

At the time, the 6-storey Melkonian Commercial Centre (MCC) was built on Melkonian territory so as to generate income for the school in order to make it financially less dependent from the AGBU. By 1989, the rent started to trickle in and eventually the CYP 1.75 million loan was paid off.

In recent years the MCC was generating enough money to support the school.  According to 2003 figures MCC generates over $650,000 annually as it collects rent from Cyprus Tourism Organisation (offices), the Army Officers’ Cooperative, the firm of Philipou & Guevherian, a tutoring centre, a restaurant (Crescendo) and a row of shops (Elements of Style, Constantinou Communications, Duxiana, a toy store, an advertising agency, an Internet café, etc.), all of them tenants at the Melkonian Commercial Centre.

The AGBU has been heavily criticized for the fact that the income from the MCC rent has never reached Melkonian School and has been going directly to the AGBU.

Closure 
The first rumors about the closure of Melkonian Educational Institute started circulating in the Summer of 2003.  On November 17, 2003 an alumnus led and well-coordinated campaign to resist the rumored closure was established.
After months of paid advertisements and heavily funded PR campaigns by the AGBU informing the public that they do not intend to close down and sell the Melkonian, on March 14, 2004 AGBU CB voted unanimously in favor of the closure.  The official decision was published 2 days afterwards on March 16, 2004.
The school was closed in June 2005.

Lawsuit 
In an effort to stop the closure of Melkonian, Patriarch Mesrob Mutafian of Constantinople, with the cooperation of Melkonian Alumni & Friends, based in Los Angeles, California, instigated lawsuits against the AGBU Central Board. Ninety five percent of Melkonian Alumni supported
the Patriarch's lawsuit and wanted the School to remain open.
Although the lawsuits failed in the United States and the Republic of Cyprus, they irreparably damaged AGBU's public image as one of the pillars of the Armenian Diaspora. Also it prevented AGBU from selling the huge Melkonian property.

Boarding Section 

The new boarding houses were constructed in early 1990s for both boys and girls living in opposite wings of the complex. Alex Manoogian's statue is prominently featured at the centre of the courtyard.  The boarding section has a capacity of accommodating circa 400 boarding students. Boys and girls accommodations are in separate building with supervisors at the doors at all hours.  The houses also include a cafeteria, where boarding students would receive their breakfasts, lunches, dinners and suppers.  There are also various areas dedicated to indoors recreational activities within this building, the largest of which is above the cafeteria with a game room, canteen and TV area.

The on-call supervisors and the resident nurse also have their offices and quarters inside this complex.

School magazines and Publications 
In 1969 and 1970 the discontinued magazine was reinstated and printed. It was called AIG. To start the magazine a cover page was needed. A competition was set up and allowed the students to turn in artwork for the cover page. The competition was won by a graduating student – Haro Bayandorian – from Iran. The same artwork was used for the next 3 years. Copies of these early magazine still exists.
Melkonian students used to publish Hayatsk, which was a newspaper run by and edited by the students themselves.
AIG was the annual yearbook for Melkonian graduates.

Celebrations 
Hokehankist - a ceremony dedicated to remembering the Melkonian brothers and their charitable deed is carried out to annually to this day.

Old Melkoniantsis, The MEI Alumni and www.MEI1970.org 
Growing up in close near-familial environment, Melkonian graduates (Melkoniantsi) remain friends many years after their graduation.  Many Melkoniantsis, both old and young, see themselves as being part of the same "Melkonian family".  A number of well organised and very active MEI Alumni chapters are established in all continents of the globe.  Of all Armenian schools Melkonian has produced a widely disproportionate share of Armenian Diaspora's prominent writers, intellectuals, academics, doctors, musicians, politicians, community leaders, persons of political influence and public figures on international stage. Some of prominent names associated with Melkonian include Vahan Tekeyan, Moushegh Ishkhan, Apraham Manoogian, Benon Sevan, Vahan Bedelian and Vahram Mavian.

The Campaign to Save Melkonian 
In 2003 an Alumni led campaign to resist the closure of Melkonian began. SaveMelkonian.org was established as campaign's information outlet, and soon attracted the attention of press, TV, political parties and numerous cultural and charity organization both in Armenia and Diaspora. Joined with Melkonian Alumni & Friends in California and many other like-minded organizations, SaveMelkonian campaign has a series of achievements in resisting AGBU's decision, which many in Armenian Diaspora regard as purely profit-driven.

The Melkoniantsi Club 
On April 8, 2008, www.Melkoniantsiclub.com, an official Melkoniantsi Social Network Website was established by Mher Asadourian to keep all the Melkoniantsis, Melkonian teachers and staff united and let them communicate and keep in touch. Melkoniantsis, teachers and staff can sign up for free, upload their picture, invite friends, chat, blog, advertise, post an event, create groups and read the news.

UPDATE: The above website is no longer on line. Try www.MEI1970.org with above focus.

Petition 

A renewed campaign appeals to the whole Armenian nation through a petition (www.midk.org) that advocates AGBU central board in New York to finally respond and start a discussion on how the school can be reopened as soon as possible. Both management and financial resources have been made available for the reopening of the school and ensuring the successful fulfillment of its mission but AGBU central board in New York so far refuses to discuss the issue at all cost even though many of the local AGBU chapters have privately or publicly raised their concerns.

Gallery

References

External links
http://www.Melkonianforever.org/  - Tracks all news and developments about the School and its destiny
http://www.melkoniannews.org/ - Official website of the Melkonian Alumni and Friends organization

http://www.mei1970.org/ - Melkonian Educational Institute graduates of 1970 era with gallery

Armenian diaspora in Cyprus
Educational institutions established in 1926
High schools and secondary schools in Cyprus
Education in Nicosia
1926 establishments in Cyprus
Armenian studies
Armenian schools